The Czech Social Democratic Party (ČSSD) leadership election of 2015 was held in March 2015. The incumbent leader and Prime Minister Bohuslav Sobotka was re-elected for another term. Sobotka was the only candidate. He received over 85% votes from delegates. 706 delegates were allowed to vote.

Voting

References

Social Democratic Party leadership election
Social Democratic Party leadership election
Single-candidate elections
Indirect elections
Czech Social Democratic Party leadership election
Czech Social Democratic Party leadership election